The Komaki Dam is an arch-gravity dam on the Shō River about  southeast of Shogawa in Toyama Prefecture, Japan. It was constructed between 1925 and 1930. The dam has an associated 90.2 MW hydroelectric power station which was commissioned in 1930. Of the nine dams on the Shō River it is the second-furthest downstream.

See also

Shogawa Goguchi Dam – downstream
Soyama Dam – upstream

References

Dams in Toyama Prefecture
Arch-gravity dams
Dams completed in 1930
Dams on the Shō River
Hydroelectric power stations in Japan